São Benedito is a municipality in the state of Ceará in the Northeast region of Brazil.

Transportation
The city is served by Walfrido Salmito de Almeida Airport.

See also
List of municipalities in Ceará

References

Municipalities in Ceará